The women's 400 metre individual medley event at the 2010 Asian Games took place on 14 November 2010 at Guangzhou Aoti Aquatics Centre.

There were 10 competitors from 8 countries who took part in this event. Two heats were held, the heat in which a swimmer competed did not formally matter for advancement, as the swimmers with the top eight times from the both field qualified for the finals.

Ye Shiwen and Li Xuanxu from China won the gold and silver medal, respectively, Cheng Wan-Jung from Chinese Taipei finished with third place, it was the first swimming medal for Chinese Taipei since 1998 Asian Games.

Schedule
All times are China Standard Time (UTC+08:00)

Records

Results

Heats

Final

References

 16th Asian Games Results

External links 
 Women's 400m Individual Medley Heats Official Website
 Women's 400m Individual Medley Ev.No.8 Final Official Website

Swimming at the 2010 Asian Games